RateSetter is a British personal loan provider, founded in 2009 as one of the pioneers of  peer-to-peer lending. The London-based company traded in the United Kingdom and (from 2014) through a locally-owned and run business in Australia. The UK business was acquired by Metro Bank in September 2020, leading to closure of the peer-to-peer products in April 2021.

The company is known for having introduced into peer-to-peer lending the concept of a "provision fund" – an internal fund which aims to help lenders manage the risk of borrower default, and is generated by borrowers' payment of a "credit rate" fee based on their credit profile. Launched in October 2010, by September 2020 the company had matched more than £4bn in loans and had over 750,000 investors and borrowers. RateSetter claimed that none of its individual investors ever lost money.

History 
RateSetter's holding company, Retail Money Market Ltd, was incorporated in October 2009 by Rhydian Lewis, an investment banker from Lazard, and Peter Behrens, a lawyer turned banker formerly of Royal Bank of Scotland. The private limited company was funded from the start by angel investors.

In July 2014, it was announced that the British Business Bank would begin lending through RateSetter to support individuals, sole traders or partnerships borrowing for business purposes. In December 2015, RateSetter moved from Southwark to new offices in Bishopsgate, London.

In June 2017, RateSetter raised £13m from existing shareholders, including Woodford Investment Management and Artemis, bringing the total amount raised to £41.5m. The following month, Paul Manduca became chairman of RateSetter; he is also chairman of Prudential plc.

In early 2018, the company announced the arrival of its Innovative Finance ISA. In its first year, it attracted over £100m in ISA subscriptions.

RateSetter's lending had an average gross yield of 8% in 2019–20.

Sale to Metro Bank 
Metro Bank plc, a London-based retail and commercial bank, announced in August 2020 that it had agreed to acquire Retail Money Market Ltd for a price of up to £12 million, with £2.5 million paid upfront and the remainder to be paid over the next three years; the latter component is conditional on meeting certain performance criteria. The announced purchase price marked a sharp decrease in the company's value, which was £200m during its last round of funding in 2017. Metro Bank acquired 100% of RateSetter shares but its stake in RateSetter Australia, valued at £13.7 million, was excluded from the transaction and remains with RateSetter shareholders. The purchase was subject to regulatory and RateSetter shareholder approval, and completed on 14 September 2020. Metro Bank said it intended to continue the RateSetter brand and its operations, with new unsecured personal lending funded by the bank's deposits, not through peer-to-peer.

In February 2021, Metro Bank bought RateSetter's remaining unsecured personal loan portfolio, valued at £384m. After the contractual two months' notice, all peer-to-peer lending accounts would be closed from 2 April and full repayment of capital made to investors. Some among the 45,000 investors objected to the inclusion in the transaction of the "provision fund", which had been bolstered by interest diverted from investors in recent months.

Effects of COVID-19 pandemic
In May 2020, since the unfolding COVID-19 pandemic was expected to cause an increase in defaulted loans, RateSetter halved the interest paid to all lenders. Lenders experienced long delays after requesting to withdraw money; in October, for some types of loan, RateSetter was processing requests made in March. Full payment of interest resumed on 28 January 2021. In early 2021 it was announced that the investment side of the business would be shut down, a move which was completed on 2 April 2021.

In Australia 
RateSetter Australia commenced operations in November 2014. The Australian business, based in Sydney, is managed and majority-owned locally, and was the first peer-to-peer lending platform in the country open to retail customers.

In December 2017, it was announced that over AU$200m had been lent via the platform. By mid-2020, lending had grown to AU$800m and the company was preparing for a stock exchange flotation.

In 2019, 14% of the company was owned by Retail Money Market Ltd; this holding was not included in the 2020 acquisition of the UK business by Metro Bank. In August 2020, RateSetter Australia was renamed Plenti ahead of an IPO which took place in September 2020.

Products 
Borrowers can apply for a loan for between 6 and 60 months. The company has strict lending criteria, accepting (in 2011) between 12 and 15 per cent of borrower applications.

References

External links
 
 Plenti, formerly RateSetter Australia

Peer-to-peer lending companies
British companies established in 2009
Financial services companies established in 2009